1991 saw many sequels and prequels in video games, such as Street Fighter II, Final Fantasy IV, Super Castlevania IV, Mega Man 4, Super Ghouls 'n Ghosts, and The Legend of Zelda: A Link to the Past, along with new titles such as Sonic the Hedgehog, Battletoads, Lemmings, Sunset Riders, Duke Nukem, Fatal Fury: King of Fighters, and Street of Rage. The year's highest-grossing video game worldwide was Capcom's arcade fighting game Street Fighter II. The year's best-selling home system was the Game Boy for the second year in a row, while the year's best-selling home video game was Sega's Sonic the Hedgehog, which was also the year's top video game rental in the United States.

Top-rated games

Game of the Year awards
The following titles won Game of the Year awards for 1991.

Famitsu Platinum Hall of Fame
The following video game releases in 1991 entered Famitsu magazine's "Platinum Hall of Fame" for receiving Famitsu scores of at least 35 out of 40.

Financial performance

Highest-grossing arcade games
The year's highest-grossing game worldwide was Street Fighter II, which alone accounted for an estimated 60% of the global arcade game market, according to Coinslot magazine. The following table lists the year's top-grossing arcade game in Japan, the United Kingdom, United States, and worldwide.

Japan
In Japan, the following titles were the top ten highest-grossing arcade games of 1991, according to the annual Gamest and Game Machine charts.

United States
In the United States, the following titles were the highest-grossing arcade video games of 1991.

Hong Kong and Australia
In Hong Kong and Australia, the following titles were the top-grossing arcade games on the monthly charts in 1991.

Best-selling home systems

Best-selling home video games
Sonic the Hedgehog was the best-selling home video game of 1991, with  copies sold worldwide during the year.

Japan
In Japan, according to Famicom Tsūshin (Famitsu) magazine, the following titles were the top ten best-selling 1991 releases, including later sales in 1992.

The following titles were the best-selling home video games on the Famitsu charts in 1991. The charts were bi-weekly up until July 1991, when they switched to a weekly format.

United Kingdom
In the United Kingdom, the following titles were the best-selling home video games on the monthly Computer and Video Games (CVG) charts in 1991.

United States
In the United States, the following titles were the top three best-selling home video game releases of 1991.

The following titles were the best-selling home video games of each month in 1991.

Events

Notable releases
January - The first two THQ releases came out in stores.
February 14 – DMA Design releases Lemmings, a puzzle game that requires the player to lead a group of lemmings through a dangerous environment to an escape portal.
 February 6 – Capcom releases Street Fighter II for arcades. It becomes highly successful and is routinely listed as the grandfather of the fighting game genre. It is also credited with revitalizing the arcade game industry at the time, and popularizing direct tournament-level competition between players.
March – AOL, SSI, TSR and Stormfront Studios collaborate and launch Neverwinter Nights, credited as the first graphical MMORPG.
May 6 – Sierra On-Line releases The Sierra Network, which is also credited as the first graphical MMORPG (due to its inclusion of The Shadow of Yserbius), TSN would later become its more memorable name, ImagiNation Network, after a total buyout from AT&T in 1994.
June 23 – Sega releases Sonic the Hedgehog for the Sega Genesis which later becomes the pack-in game and defining title for the console. It introduces the eponymous character, who would go on to be Sega's mascot. Sega also releases a version of the game for the Master System and Game Gear.

July 19 – Square releases Final Fantasy IV in Japan, the first Final Fantasy game for the Super Famicom (released in November as Final Fantasy II in North America).
August 13 – Intelligent Systems releases SimCity for the Super Nintendo Entertainment System.
August 23 – Nintendo releases Super Mario World and F-Zero along with the Super Nintendo Entertainment System in North America. Super Mario World was the original pack-in game for the SNES. The game introduces the Yoshi character to the Mario series.
September – Namco releases Starblade for arcades, featuring one of the earliest instances of real-time 3D graphics in video games.
September – Electronic Arts releases motorcycle racing combat game Road Rash for Sega Genesis, starting the series.
November – Nintendo releases Metroid II: Return of Samus for the Game Boy in North America.
November – Delphine Software releases cinematic action-adventure game Another World for the Amiga, which uses polygons instead of sprites.
November 21 – Nintendo releases The Legend of Zelda: A Link to the Past for the Super Famicom in Japan.
November 25 – SNK releases Fatal Fury: King of Fighters for the Neo Geo.
December 1 – LucasArts releases Monkey Island 2: LeChuck's Revenge for Amiga, MS-DOS, Macintosh, and FM Towns.
December 4 – Konami releases Super Castlevania IV for SNES in North America.
December 6 – Mega Man 4 is released in Japan.
 December 13 – Tecmo releases Tecmo Super Bowl for NES, the follow-up to 1989's Tecmo Bowl.
December 16 – MicroProse releases Civilization. As of 2005, it is still Sid Meier's most successful game.
Team17 release Alien Breed, the first of the series, for the Amiga.

Hardware
 July – Atari updates their Lynx handheld system with a smaller form-factor, better screen, and longer battery life.
August 23 – Super Nintendo Entertainment System released in North America.
December 1 – Sega releases the Mega-CD in Japan.
September – S3 launches with the 86C911, often regarded as the first significant graphics accelerator chip for the Microsoft Windows platform.

Business
New companies: Vicarious Visions, Inc, id Software, Bungie, Silicon & Synapse (now known as Blizzard Entertainment), The 3DO Company (founded as SMSG, Inc.), Cyberdreams

See also
1991 in games

References

 
Video games by year